Sexy Galexy (born Lexi Leigh) is an Australian drag king and performer.

Career 
Sexy Galexy began her career performing in drag shows and events in her hometown of Perth during the late 1990s, during the golden age of lesbian and drag king culture. Sexy Galexy performed in the Drag King Sydney which ran from 1999 to 2000. In 2002, Sexy Galexy and DJ Sveti co-founded the weekly event Kingki Kingdom which was later renamed Queer Central in 2006. Kingki Kingdom became popular in the lesbian community as a venue for expression and community involvement. Sexy Galexy performed at the 2005 Sydney Gay and Lesbian Mardi Gras. She was a reporter at the Sydney Gay and Lesbian Mardi Gras for QueerTV. In 2008 Sexy Galexy was featured on the cover of Gscene, a Brighton and Hove LGBT interest magazine.

Sexy Galexy returned to Perth in 2014 and performed the show "Manliness: The Angle of My Dangle". Prior to that, she had performed in pride festivals and drag shows in Europe and North America. Sexy Galexy is known for the live show "Manliness Mansion", which was performed at festivals Melbourne International Comedy Festival and Perth Fringe World in 2015.

In April 2020 Sexy Galexy appeared on Socially Distant, a drag livestream web series hosted by Landon Cider. Sexy Galexy has been cited as an inspiration by other drag kings such as Landon Cider and Adam All.

References 

Australian LGBT entertainers
People from Perth, Western Australia
Australian women artists
Drag kings
Lesbian culture in Australia
Year of birth missing (living people)
Living people